Andreas Gohl (born 29 January 1994 in Bludenz) is an Austrian freestyle skier, specializing in halfpipe.

Gohl competed at the 2014 Winter Olympics for Austria. He placed 20th in the qualifying round in the halfpipe, failing to advance.

Gohl made his World Cup debut in January 2013. As of April 2014, his best World Cup finish is 10th, at Calgary in 2013–14. His best World Cup overall finish in halfpipe is 29th, in 2013–14.

References

1994 births
Living people
Olympic freestyle skiers of Austria
Freestyle skiers at the 2014 Winter Olympics
Freestyle skiers at the 2018 Winter Olympics
People from Bludenz
Austrian male freestyle skiers
Sportspeople from Vorarlberg